Fraser Valley Regional Library (FVRL) is the largest public library system in British Columbia, Canada, with 25 community libraries serving 700,000 people in its service area. Established in 1930, it is funded with taxes raised in the community it serves, plus a Government of British Columbia operating grant. The governing board consists of elected officials representing 15 member municipalities and regional districts.

Founding 1927-1930 
Fraser Valley Regional Library (FVRL), established in 1930 in the Fraser Valley area of British Columbia (BC), was the first system of its kind in North America.

The idea of bringing the library to the rural population in BC began in 1927. The Provincial Public Library Commission organized a province-wide survey of library services in BC. The key finding from the survey was that large administrative library districts based on cooperation and resource sharing between municipalities and school districts should be created to serve BC’s rural communities who could not afford to provide a library service on their own. Based on this recommendation, the Commission sought funding to carry out an initial trial project.

It began serving residents in the early 1930s with the introduction of the Fraser Valley Book Van. The Book Van was the public library to the rural residents from Ladner to Hope. This travelling library, which displayed books along its outside shelves, travelled through the valley to small towns and villages stopping at grocery stores, schoolhouses, and gas stations. The Book Van system operated in conjunction with local libraries in located in the larger towns throughout the valley..

Demonstration project 1930-1934 

The Carnegie Corporation of New York awarded a grant of $100,000 to establish and maintain a rural library project for five years. After considering various regions of the province, the Commission selected the Fraser Valley as the site of BC’s book experiment. The library’s first director Dr. Helen Gordon Stewart headed the project.

Covering an area of approximately 2,600 square km and containing 24 separate governing bodies, the Fraser Valley Book Van made its first public appearance in July 1930. Administrative headquarters for the project was located in New Westminster while Chilliwack served as the main distribution centre. The number of borrowers quickly soared, and six other libraries opened soon after.

Creation of the Fraser Valley Union Library 1934-1950 
To continue library service to the Fraser Valley after the Carnegie funds were exhausted, residents were asked to vote whether they wished to support the library through local taxes. A referendum was scheduled for January 1934. The timing was difficult since taxpayers were asked to vote in favour of higher taxes during a severe economic depression. Stewart and her staff launched a massive campaign of public meetings, handouts, posters, and newspaper articles to gain support. Twenty of the original 24 areas voted "yes" and the Fraser Valley Union Library was created as the first regional library system in North America.

The resources of the Carnegie Demonstration Project were turned over to the new Library Board of Management on September 28, 1934, during a ceremony held in Chilliwack, BC.  At this time, Stewart left the Fraser Valley to organize other regional libraries. Soon after, the library headquarters was relocated to its present location in Abbotsford, British Columbia.

In order to establish the first operating budget, board members voted a per capita tax rate of 35 cents. This low rate of support was a severe handicap to the library service until 1950, when the rate was raised to 40 cents. Even with member municipalities providing rent-free facilities, the library system has always had a challenge of operating with one of the lowest tax levies in the province.

Present day 
In 1951, the official name was changed to the Fraser Valley Regional Library District (FVRL). FVRL is the largest public library system in British Columbia.

FVRL is governed by a board of directors and financially supported by its member municipalities and through a Government of BC operating grant. Board members are elected officials of its member municipalities.

Special collections

World languages 
FVRL has recognized the need to better serve the culturally diverse communities in which it operates and has allotted $80,000 per year to its World Languages Collection. The collection is split between the 24 branches and consists of over 42,000 items in 14 languages. It includes a mix of both adult and children's fiction and non-fiction books, DVDs and CDs.

Lifelong learning programs 
FVRL supports lifelong learning and literacy. To promote ongoing learning and literacy within the community FVRL offers various programs and workshops for all age groups from toddlers to seniors. Programs include:

Storytimes
Author readings
Computer and Internet classes
Credit management
Family reading clubs
How to write a will

Awards

Locations 
FVRL has an Administrative Centre located in Abbotsford and 25 community branches located in 15 municipalities.

References

External links 
 Fraser Valley Regional Library

Public libraries in British Columbia
Libraries established in 1930
1930 establishments in Canada